One Day International (ODI) cricket is played between international cricket teams who are Full Members of the International Cricket Council (ICC) as well as the top four Associate members. Unlike Test matches, ODIs consist of one inning per team, having a limit in the number of overs, currently 50 overs per innings – although in the past this has been 55 or 60 overs. ODI matches are a subset of List A cricket and so records and statistics are recorded both for specifically for ODIs and within List A.

The earliest match recognised as an ODI was played between England and Australia in January 1971; since when there have been more than 4,000 ODIs played by 28 teams. The frequency of matches has steadily increased, partly because of the increase in the number of ODI-playing countries, and partly as the cricket boards of those nations seek to maximise their revenue with the increased popularity of cricket, a process that dates from the time of the Packer Revolution. In February 2022, in their home series against the West Indies, India played their 1,000th ODI match, becoming the first team to play one thousand matches in this format.

The trend of countries to increase the number of ODI matches they play means that the aggregate lists are dominated by modern players, though this trend is reversing as teams play more Twenty20 Internationals. Indian cricketer Sachin Tendulkar has scored the most runs in ODIs with a total of 18,426. Sri Lankan spinner Muttiah Muralitharan is the highest ODI wicket-taker with a total of 534 wickets. The record for most dismissals by a wicket-keeper is held by Kumar Sangakkara of Sri Lanka while the record for most catches by a fielder is held by Sri Lankan Mahela Jayawardene.

Listing criteria
In general the top five are listed in each category (except when there is a tie for the last place among the five, when all the tied record holders are noted).

Listing notation
Team notation
 (300–3) indicates that a team scored 300 runs for three wickets and the innings was closed, either due to a successful run chase or if no overs remained (or are able) to be bowled.
 (300) indicates that a team scored 300 runs and was all out, either by losing all ten wickets or by having one or more batsmen unable to bat and losing the remaining wickets.

Batting notation
 (100*) indicates that a batsman scored 100 runs and was not out.
 (175) indicates that a batsman scored 175 runs and was out after that.

Bowling notation
 (5–40) indicates that a bowler has captured 5 wickets while giving away 40 runs.
 (49.5 overs) indicates that a team bowled 49 complete overs (each of six legal deliveries), and one incomplete over of just five deliveries.

Currently playing
 Record holders who are currently playing ODIs (i.e. their record details listed could change) are shown by ‡.

Seasons
 Cricket is played during the summer months in most countries. Domestic cricket seasons in Australia, New Zealand, South Africa, India, Pakistan, Sri Lanka, Bangladesh, Zimbabwe and the West Indies may therefore span two calendar years, and are by convention said to be played in (e.g.) "2008–09". A cricket season in England is described as a single year. e.g. "2009". An international ODI series or tournament may be for a much shorter duration, and Cricinfo treats this issue by stating "any series or matches which began between May and September of any given year will appear in the relevant single year season and any that began between October and April will appear in the relevant cross-year season". In the record tables, a two-year span generally indicates that the record was set within a domestic season in one of the above named countries.

Team records

Team wins, losses, ties, and no results

Result records

Greatest win margin (by runs)

Greatest win margin (by balls remaining)

Greatest win margin (by wickets) 
Chasing teams have won by 10 wickets on 57 occasions, with West Indies winning by this margin a record 10 times.

Highest run chases

Narrowest win margins (by runs) 
The narrowest margin of victory by teams batting first is one run, which has been achieved in 31 ODIs. Australia have won by this margin on six occasions, which is the most for any team.

Narrowest win margins (by balls remaining)
Teams batting second have won on the final ball of their innings 36 times, with South Africa winning in such a manner seven times.

Narrowest win margins (by wickets)
The narrowest margin of victory by wickets is by a single wicket, which has settled 55 ODIs. Both West Indies and New Zealand have recorded such victory on eight occasions.

Lowest totals defended successfully

Most consecutive wins

Most consecutive defeats

Team scoring records

Highest innings totals

Highest innings total batting second

Highest match aggregate

Lowest innings totals

Shortest completed innings (by balls)

Most sixes in an innings

Most fours in an innings

Individual records (batting)

Most career runs

Most career runs – progression of record

Most runs in each batting position

Fastest to multiples of 1000 runs

Highest individual scores

Highest individual score (progression of record)

Highest individual score at each position

Highest career average

Highest average at each position

Highest strike rates

Most centuries

Most fifties

Fastest fifties

Fastest centuries

Most sixes in career

Most fours in career

Most sixes in an innings

Most fours in an innings

Highest strike rates in an innings

Most runs in a calendar year

Most runs in a series

Most runs in an over

Most ducks in career

Most innings before first duck

Most runs in a career without scoring a century

Individual records (Bowling)

Most wickets

Fastest to multiples of wickets

Best innings figures

Best innings figures – progression of record

Best career bowling average

Best career economy rate

Best career bowling strike rate

Most 5 wickets in an innings

Best economy rates in an innings

Best strike rates in an innings

Most runs conceded in an innings

Most wickets in a calendar year

Most wickets in a series

Individual records (fielding)

Most catches in ODI career

Most catches in a series

Individual records (wicket-keeping)

Most dismissals

Most catches

Most stumpings

Most dismissals in a series

Individual match records

Most matches played

Most consecutive career matches

Most matches played as captain

Most matches won as a captain

Youngest player on debut

Oldest player on debut

Oldest player

Most Player-of-the-Match awards

Most Player-of-the-series awards

Partnership records

Highest partnerships

Highest partnerships by wicket

Highest overall partnership runs by a pair

Individual records (officials)

Most matches as an umpire

Most matches as a match referee

See also

 List of batsmen who have scored over 10,000 One Day International cricket runs
 List of One Day International cricket hat-tricks
 List of Cricket World Cup records
 List of first-class cricket records
 List of List A cricket records
 List of Twenty20 cricket records
 List of Australia One Day International cricket records
 List of Bangladesh One Day International cricket records
 List of England One Day International cricket records
 List of India One Day International cricket records
 List of Ireland One Day International cricket records
 List of New Zealand One Day International cricket records
 List of Pakistan One Day International cricket records
 List of South Africa One Day International cricket records
 List of Sri Lanka One Day International cricket records
 List of West Indies One Day International cricket records
 List of Zimbabwe One Day International cricket records
 List of Test cricket records
 List of Twenty20 International records

References

One Day International cricket records
Cricket-related lists